Trowbridge is the county town of Wiltshire, England, on the River Biss in the west of the county. The town had a population of 37,169 in 2021.

Long a market town, the Kennet and Avon canal to the north of Trowbridge played an instrumental part in the town's development as it allowed coal to be transported from the Somerset Coalfield and so marked the advent of steam-powered manufacturing in woollen cloth mills. The town was the foremost producer of this mainstay of contemporary clothing and blankets in south west England in the late 18th and early 19th centuries, by which time it held the nickname "The Manchester of the West".

The civil parish of Trowbridge had a population of 33,108 at the 2011 census. The parish encompasses the settlements of Longfield, Lower Studley, Upper Studley, Studley Green and Trowle Common.

History

Toponymy

The origin of the name Trowbridge is uncertain; one source claims derivation from treow-brycg, meaning "Tree Bridge", referring to the first bridge over the Biss, while another states the true meaning is the bridge by Trowle, the name of a hamlet and a common to the west of the town. On John Speed's map of Wiltshire (1611), the name is spelt Trubridge.

Early history
In the 10th century, written records and architectural ruins begin marking Trowbridge's existence as a village. In the 1086 Domesday Book the village of Straburg, as Trowbridge was then known, was recorded as having 24 households, well endowed with land, particularly arable ploughlands, and rendering 8 pounds sterling to its feudal lord a year. Its feudal lord was an Anglo-Saxon named Brictric, who was the largest landowner in Wiltshire.

Castle

The first mention of Trowbridge Castle was in 1139 when it was besieged. It was no longer in military use by the 14th century and by the 16th only ruins remained.
The castle is thought to have been a motte-and-bailey castle, and its influence can still be seen in the town today. Fore Street follows the path of the castle ditch, and town has a Castle Street and the Castle Place Shopping Centre.

It is likely the Castle was built by Humphrey I de Bohun; his family dominated the town for over a hundred years.

The most notable member of the family was Henry de Bohun, born around 1176, who became lord of the manor when he was about 15 years of age. It was he who really began to shape the medieval town. In 1200 he obtained a market charter, arguably the earliest for a town in Wiltshire, and one of the earliest in England. His officials were to lay out burgage plots for traders, artisans, and shopkeepers. The outline of these plots can still be seen today in the footprints of some of the present shops in Fore Street.

Within Trowbridge Castle was a 10th-century Anglo-Saxon church. Henry de Bohun turned this to secular use and instead had a new church built outside the Castle; this was the first St James's Church. In the base of the tower of the present day church, below the subsequently added spire, can be seen the Romanesque architecture of the period.

In 1200 Henry de Bohun was created Earl of Hereford by King John. Like other barons, Henry was later threatened by King John and his caput of Trowbridge was taken from him. Henry then joined with the other barons to oppose John's arbitrary rule and forced him to seal Magna Carta (the Great Charter) at Runnymede; and was elected as one of the 25 enforcers of the charter. Some years after Runnymede, Henry regained control of Trowbridge.

Woollen cloth industry
Trowbridge developed as a centre for woollen cloth production from the 14th century. Thus before the start of the Tudor period, the towns of south-west Wiltshire stood out from the rest of the county with all the signs of increasing wealth and prosperity during the period of trade recovery led by exports begun under Yorkist Edward IV and, still more, during expansion under Henry VII, when England's annual woollen exports increased from some 60,000 to some 80,000 cloths of assize.

During the 17th century the production of woollen cloth became increasingly industrialised. However, mechanisation was resisted by workers in traditional trades; there were riots in 1785 and 1792, and again in the era of Luddism (1811–1816) owing to the introduction of the flying shuttle. Thomas Helliker, a shearman's apprentice, became one of the martyrs of the Industrial Revolution in 1803 when he was hanged at Fisherton Jail, Salisbury. Nevertheless, at one point in 1820, Trowbridge's scale of production was such it was described as the "Manchester of the West". It had over 20 woollen cloth producing factories, making it comparable to northern industrial towns such as Rochdale.

The woollen cloth industry declined in the late 19th century with the advent of ring-spinning, and this decline continued throughout the 20th century, although Trowbridge's West of England cloth maintained a reputation for excellent quality until the end. The last mill, Salter's Home Mill, closed in 1982 and is now the home of Boswell's Café and Trowbridge Museum and Art Gallery, integrated into the Shires Shopping Centre. The museum portrays the history of woollen cloth production in the town; the displays include a rare Spinning Jenny, one of only five remaining worldwide. There are also working looms on display. Clark's Mill is now home to offices; straddling the nearby River Biss is the "Handle House", formerly used for drying and storage of teazles used to raise the nap of cloth. This is one of very few such buildings still known to exist in the United Kingdom.

1800s to present

In its place a bedding industry developed, initially using wool cast off from the mills; the company now known as Airsprung Furniture Group was started in the town in the 1870s. Food production also developed in the town when Abraham Bowyer started his business in 1805 which eventually, as Pork Farms Bowyers, became one of the largest employers in the town until closure in April 2008 when production moved to the Shaftesbury and Nottingham factories.

The town became the county town of Wiltshire in 1889 when Wiltshire County Council was formed and sought a place which representatives from Swindon and Salisbury, among others, could reach and return home from in one day. Trowbridge fulfilled this criterion by virtue of its railway connections and thus was chosen as the county town, further reinforced by the construction of the county hall in 1939.

The brewing company Ushers of Trowbridge opened in 1824, and developed the brewery in the town. This was finally shut in 2000 following several changes of ownership and its equipment was sold to North Korea, where it forms the core of the Taedonggang brewery, just outside Pyongyang.

Food production continues in the town through companies such as frozen food processor Apetito. The largest employers are Wiltshire Council and Apetito.

Architecture

There is much of architectural interest in Trowbridge, including many of the old buildings associated with the textile industry, and the Newtown conservation area, a protected zone of mostly Victorian houses. The town has six Grade I listed buildings, namely St James's Church, Lovemead House on Roundstone Street, and numbers 46, 64, 68 and 70 Fore Street. The latter is referred to more commonly as Parade House.

Trowbridge Town Hall is in Market Street, opposite the entrance to the now-pedestrianised Fore Street. This three-storey building with an Italianate clock-tower was presented to the residents of the town by a local mill-oner, Sir William Roger Brown, in 1889 to celebrate Queen Victoria's golden jubilee. The building was the seat of local government until 1974 and subsequently accommodated the magistrates' courts until 2003. More recently it has been used for exhibitions and community events.

Governance
There are seven electoral divisions in Trowbridge for elections to Wiltshire Council, which are also the wards of the town council. Together, they cover the same area as the civil parish.

Trowbridge is within the South West Wiltshire parliamentary constituency, which has been represented by Andrew Murrison (Conservative) since its formation in 2010.

County Hall in Bythesea Road, Trowbridge, is the administrative centre for Wiltshire Council, a unitary authority created in April 2009 which replaced both West Wiltshire District Council and the former Wiltshire County Council, also headquartered at County Hall since 1940.

The Town Council is the first tier of local government and is composed of 21 councillors. It is currently held by the Liberal Democrats who have 10 seats in addition to the 9 Conservatives and 2 Independents.

Geography 
The River Biss enters Trowbridge from the southeast, where it flows through Biss Meadows, managed as a country park. In the north of the town it is joined by the Lambrok Stream, then continues north to join the River Avon near Staverton.

Northwest of the town, part of the Avon Green Belt prevents expansion towards Bradford-on-Avon. To the north and northwest, housing areas in Staverton and Hilperton parishes are contiguous with Trowbridge's urban area; however, to the south and southeast, the villages of Southwick, North Bradley, Yarnbrook and West Ashton maintain their separate identities.

Demography
The first official census of 1801 showed Trowbridge having 5,799 inhabitants, which rose very rapidly to 9,545 in 1821. The population rose by less than 50% in the 130 years to 1951, compared to a considerably larger increase in the population of the country as a whole. From 1951 to 2011, the population increased by 133%. Coinciding with this increase a considerable conversion of arable fields and some riverside meadows to residential estates took place.

According to the census in 2011, the ethnic breakdown of the population of Trowbridge parish was: White 94.8%, Mixed/multiple ethnic groups 1.9%, Asian/Asian British 1.5%, Black/African/Caribbean/Black British 1.1%, Other ethnic group 0.8%. The population of the built-up area, which includes Staverton and Hilperton parishes, was 39,409 in 2011 and was estimated to have grown to 43,719 by mid-2020.

In 2018 the Office for National Statistics estimated the population of the larger "community area" at 45,822, making Trowbridge the largest area in Wiltshire (excluding Swindon), with Chippenham close behind in second place and Salisbury third.

Transport
Trowbridge railway station was opened in 1848 on the Westbury–Bradford-on-Avon section of the Wilts, Somerset and Weymouth Railway. Today this line forms part of both the Wessex Main Line (Bristol–Westbury–Southampton) and the Heart of Wessex Line (Bristol–Westbury–Weymouth), while the original route to Melksham, Chippenham and Swindon is used by the TransWilts service. Other services from Trowbridge join the Great Western Main Line at Bath and Chippenham, or join the Reading to Taunton line at Westbury.

The A361 runs through the town, connecting it to Swindon to the north-east and Barnstaple to the south-west, while the north–south A350 primary route to Poole passes close to the town.

Education
Primary schools in the town include Bellefield Primary School, The Grove Primary School, Holbrook Primary School, Oasis Academy Longmeadow, Paxcroft Primary School, The Mead Community Primary School, Newtown Primary School, Castle Mead School, St John's Catholic Primary School, Studley Green Primary School and Walwayne Court Primary School. Children may also attend schools in adjacent parishes including North Bradley CE Primary School, Hilperton CE Primary School and Staverton CE Primary School.

Secondary schools in Trowbridge are the Clarendon Academy, the John of Gaunt School and St Augustine's Catholic College. All of the secondary schools also operate their own sixth forms. Larkrise School is a special school for children aged 3 to 19.

Wiltshire College has one of its four campuses in Trowbridge offering a range of vocational courses for school-leavers.

Shopping and entertainment
The town centre is compact, and the focus for shops is the ancient Fore Street; the more modern Shires and Castle Place shopping centres provide a wide variety of outlets. The Shires Gateway, situated by the entrance to the Shires shopping centre car park, was opened in 2009.

The civic centre, opened in 2011 and next to the town's central park, is a conference and entertainment venue and is home to the town's information centre as well as Trowbridge Town Council. A nearby leisure development includes an Odeon cinema and several food vendors (Wagamama, Nando's etc.).

The former Town Hall, a large Victorian building, is a performance and exhibition venue and is also used by community groups. At Wiltshire College the Arc Theatre is used by students and local groups. There is a concert hall at Wiltshire Music Centre in neighbouring Bradford-on-Avon.

Trowbridge is part of the historic West Country Carnival circuit, and has also given its name to the Trowbridge Village Pump Festival. The festival was held in the old stablehouse of the Lamb Inn public house on Mortimer Street in Trowbridge, and was founded by Alan Briars and Dave Newman. Currently the event, renamed Trowbridge Festival, takes place at Stowford Manor Farm between Wingfield near Trowbridge and Farleigh Hungerford in Somerset.

Notable people

Methodism was introduced to the town by local evangelist Joanna Turner in the 18th century. Trowbridge was the birthplace of Sir Isaac Pitman in 1813, developer of the Pitman system of shorthand writing, who has several memorial plaques. Matthew Hutton (later archbishop of Canterbury) was the town's rector from 1726 to 1730. The poet George Crabbe held the same position from 1814 until his death in 1832.

Mary Mortimer, born in Trowbridge in 1816, became an American educator. Sir William Cook, born in Trowbridge in 1905, was involved with the development of the British nuclear bomb at Aldermaston in the 1950s, becoming the establishment's deputy director.

Sir William Roger Brown (1831–1902), a Trowbridge mill-owner, employed more than a thousand people and donated a school, almshouses, and the Trowbridge Town Hall to the town.

David Stratton, the film critic was born in Trowbridge in 1939. He founded the Melksham and District Film Society before emigrating to Australia in 1963, where he ran the Sydney Film Festival for 17 years, as well as presenting the film review shows The Movie Show on SBS and At The Movies on the ABC.

Nick Blackwell, professional boxer and former British middleweight champion, is from Trowbridge, as are footballer Nathan Dyer (who played for Leicester City in the 2015 season when they won the Premier League), disgraced snooker player Stephen Lee, and Daniel Talbot, winner of the  relay at the 2017 World Athletics Championships in a time of 37.47sec – the third fastest time in history.

The Oliver Twins, who created the Dizzy series of games amongst others, and in 1990 founded Interactive Studios (later Blitz Games), grew up in Trowbridge. A building at the Clarendon Academy is named after the brothers.

Town redevelopment

Since 2002, there have been plans in place to redevelop significant town centre sites. Trowbridge Community Area Future (TCAF) produced a Community Area Plan in 2004, to guide future development.

In the early 1990s the supermarket chain Tesco moved from St Stephen's Place to a site adjoining the A361 on County Way. The former site remained dormant for a decade. The building was demolished but a pile of rubble, nicknamed 'Mount Crushmore' by local media, remained. Legal & General acquired the land and construction of St Stephen's Place Leisure Park began in 2012. A seven-screen Odeon cinema and Nando's restaurant opened to the public in October 2013. A Premier Inn, Frankie and Benny's and Prezzo followed in 2014.

The former Usher's brewery site has also undergone redevelopment over a number of years, with Newland Homes building town centre flats incorporating the frontage of the Usher's building.

In April 2009, building work started on one of the town's biggest brownfield sites, the former Usher's bottling plant. This was developed into a Sainsbury's supermarket, a public square and housing.

Sport and leisure

The town has a non-league football club, Trowbridge Town F.C., who play at Woodmarsh to the south of the town, near North Bradley.

Trowbridge Cricket Club play at Trowbridge Cricket Club Ground which is also used by Wiltshire County. The town's 1st XI play in the Wiltshire division of the West of England Premier League.

Trowbridge Rugby Football Club, whose ground is at Hilperton to the northeast of the town, play in Southern Counties South.

Trowbridge Sports Centre, on the same site as The Clarendon Academy, has the town's only indoor swimming pool.

A greyhound racing track was opened around the Frome Road ground used by Trowbridge Town F.C. from 3 July 1976 until July 1979. The racing was independent (not affiliated to the sports governing body the National Greyhound Racing Club) and was known as a flapping track, which was the nickname given to independent tracks. A series of meetings were also held during 1953.

Town twinning

Trowbridge is twinned with four towns: Oujda, the area of Morocco where most of the town's immigrant population originate, since 2006;
Leer in Germany, since 1989;
Charenton-le-Pont in France since 1996;
and Elbląg in Poland, as part of West Wiltshire district twinning, since 2000.
The town was the first in England to twin with an Arab Muslim country.

See also
List of places in Wiltshire

References

External links

Trowbridge Town Council
Trowbridge history (Wiltshire Council)
Out and about in Trowbridge – Ken Rogers, The Historian, Summer 2010 pp. 28–31

 
County towns in England
Towns in Wiltshire
Civil parishes in Wiltshire